The canton of Mennecy is an administrative division of the Essonne department, Île-de-France region, northern France. Its borders were modified at the French canton reorganisation which came into effect in March 2015. Its seat is in Mennecy.

It consists of the following communes:

Auvernaux
Ballancourt-sur-Essonne
Baulne
Boigneville
Boutigny-sur-Essonne
Buno-Bonnevaux
Champcueil
Chevannes
Le Coudray-Montceaux
Courances
Courdimanche-sur-Essonne
Dannemois
La Ferté-Alais
Fontenay-le-Vicomte
Gironville-sur-Essonne
Guigneville-sur-Essonne
Itteville
Maisse
Mennecy
Milly-la-Forêt
Moigny-sur-École
Mondeville
Nainville-les-Roches
Oncy-sur-École
Ormoy
Prunay-sur-Essonne
Soisy-sur-École
Videlles

References

Cantons of Essonne